Swan (Portuguese: Cisne) is a 2011 Portuguese film directed by Teresa Villaverde.

Plot summary

Cast
 Beatriz Batarda as Vera
 Miguel Nunes as Pablo
 Israel Pimenta as Sam
 Sérgio Fernandes as Alce
 Rita Loureiro as Bela
 Marcello Urgeghe as Santis
 Tânia Paiva as Amy
 Carlos Guímaro as Taxista

Reception
The film was shown at the Orizzonti section of the 68th Venice International Film Festival.

References

External links
 
 
 

2011 films
Portuguese drama films
Films directed by Teresa Villaverde